Jo Jo Dan (born Ionuț Dan Ion; 9 August 1981) is a Romanian professional boxer and world title challenger. He currently fights out of Montreal, Quebec, Canada.

Professional boxing career 
Dan made his professional debut in 2004. On 30 November 2013 he defeated Kevin Bizier by unanimous decision to win the NABA welterweight and IBF Inter-Continental welterweight titles.

Professional boxing record 

|-
|align="center" colspan=8|41 fights, 36 wins (19 knockouts), 5 losses (2 knockouts)
|-
|align=center style="border-style: none none solid solid; background: #e3e3e3"|Result
|align=center style="border-style: none none solid solid; background: #e3e3e3"|Record
|align=center style="border-style: none none solid solid; background: #e3e3e3"|Opponent
|align=center style="border-style: none none solid solid; background: #e3e3e3"|Type
|align=center style="border-style: none none solid solid; background: #e3e3e3"|Round, time
|align=center style="border-style: none none solid solid; background: #e3e3e3"|Date
|align=center style="border-style: none none solid solid; background: #e3e3e3"|Location
|align=center style="border-style: none none solid solid; background: #e3e3e3"|Notes
|- style="text-align:center;"
|Loss
|36-5
|align=left| Jamal James
|UD
|10
|2017-07-15
|align=left|
|align=left|
|- align=center
|Win
|36-4
|align=left| Jesus Gurrola
|TKO
|5 (8)
|2017-03-30
|align=left|
|align=left|
|- align=center
|Loss
|35-4
|align=left| Jarrett Hurd
|TKO
|6 (10)
|2016-11-12
|align=left|
|align=left|
|- align=center
|Win
|35-3 
|align=left| Rafal Jackiewicz
| UD || 8
|2015-09-11
|align=left|
|align=left|
|- align=center
|Loss
|34-3
|align=left| Kell Brook
| RTD || 4 
|2015-03-28 ||align=left|
|align=left|
|-align=center
|Win
|34-2
|align=left| Kevin Bizier 
| SD || 12
|2014-12-19 || align=left| 
|align=left|
|-align=center
|Win
|33-2
|align=left| Łukasz Janik  
| TKO || 5 
|2014-05-22 || align=left| 
|align=left| 
|-align=center
|Win
|32-2
|align=left| Kevin Bizier
| SD || 12
|2013-11-30 || align=left| 
|align=left|
|-align=center
|Win
|31-2
|align=left| Damian Frias
| UD || 8 
|2013-04-04 || align=left|  
|align=left|
|-align=center
|Win
|30-2
|align=left| Franklin Gonzalez
| TKO || 5 
|2012-12-19 || align=left|  
|align=left|
|-align=center
|Loss
|29-2
|align=left| Selçuk Aydın
| UD || 12
|2011-11-26 || align=left| 
|align=left|
|-align=center
|Win
|29-1
| align=left| Iwan Azore
| TKO || 3 
|2011-07-29
|align=left| 
|align=left|
|-align=center
|Win
|28-1
|align=left| Steve Forbes
| TD || 6 
|2011-02-11 || align=left| 
|align=left|
|-align=center
|Win
|27-1
|align=left| Andres Pablo Villafane
| KO || 4 
|2010-10-15 || align=left| 
|align=left|
|-align=center
|Loss
|26-1
|align=left| Selçuk Aydın
| SD || 12
|2010-06-05 || align=left| 
|align=left|
|-align=center
|Win
|26-0
|align=left| Andre Marcos Nascimento
| KO || 10 
|2010-04-10 || align=left| 
|align=left|
|-align=center
|Win
|25-0
|align=left| Walter Sergio Gomez
| UD || 12
|2009-05-06 || align=left| 
|align=left|
|-align=center
|Win
|24-0
|align=left| Cesar Soriano
| UD || 4
|2009-03-13 || align=left| 
|align=left|
|-align=center
|Win
|23-0
|align=left| Miguel Casillas
| KO || 11 
|2008-12-19 || align=left| 
|align=left|
|-align=center
|Win
|22-0
|align=left| Peter Semo
| UD || 12
|2008-08-01 || align=left| 
|align=left|
|-align=center
|Win
|21-0
|align=left| Raul Horacio Balbi
| KO || 3 
|2008-04-19 || align=left| 
|align=left|
|-align=center
|Win
|20-0
|align=left| Jose Leonardo Corona
| KO || 3 
|2008-02-29 || align=left| 
|align=left|
|-align=center
|Win
|19-0
|align=left| Paul Delgado
| KO || 12
|2007-10-19 || align=left| 
|align=left|
|-align=center
|Win
|18-0
|align=left| Walter Orlando Acosta
| TKO || 2 
|2007-06-15 || align=left| 
|align=left|
|-align=center
|Win
|17-0
|align=left| Ricardo Cano
| UD || 8
|2007-05-09 || align=left| 
|align=left|
|-align=center
|Win
|16-0
|align=left| Christopher Henry
| UD || 8
|2007-01-26 || align=left| 
|align=left|
|-align=center
|Win
|15-0
|align=left| Jorge Daniel Miranda
| TKO || 3 
|2006-09-15 || align=left| 
|align=left|
|-align=center
|Win
|14-0
|align=left| Shawn Garnett
| UD || 6
|2006-05-16 || align=left| 
|align=left|
|-align=center
|Win
|13-0
|align=left| Ulises Jimenez
| UD || 6
|2006-03-24 || align=left| 
|align=left|
|-align=center
|Win
|12-0
|align=left| Darien Ford
| UD || 6
|2005-12-02 || align=left| 
|align=left|
|-align=center
|Win
|11-0
|align=left| Sebastien Hamel
| TKO || 4 
|2005-09-16 || align=left| 
|align=left|
|-align=center
|Win
|10-0
|align=left| Amadou Diallo
| UD || 6
|2005-06-03 || align=left| 
|align=left|
|-align=center
|Win
|9-0
|align=left| Ivo Golakov
| TKO || 4 
|2005-04-21 || align=left| 
|align=left|
|-align=center
|Win
|8-0
|align=left| Francisco Guillen
| TKO || 4 
|2005-03-18 || align=left| 
|align=left|
|-align=center
|Win
|7-0
|align=left| Terry Lantz
| TKO || 5 
|2005-02-10 || align=left| 
|align=left|
|-align=center
|Win
|6-0
|align=left| Joshua Smith
| TKO || 3 
|2004-12-11 || align=left| 
|align=left|
|-align=center
|Win
|5-0
|align=left| Bakary Sako
| TKO || 2 
|2004-12-03 || align=left| 
|align=left|
|-align=center
|Win
|4-0
|align=left| Bakary Sako
| UD || 4
|2004-11-03 || align=left| 
|align=left|
|-align=center
|Win
|3-0
|align=left| Amadou Diallo
| UD || 4
|2004-09-29 || align=left| 
|align=left|
|-align=center
|Win
|2-0
|align=left| Darren Kenny
| UD || 4
|2004-09-09 || align=left| 
|align=left|
|-align=center
|Win
|1-0
|align=left| Jeff Hill
| TKO || 2 
| 2004-04-21 || align=left| 
|align=left|
|-align=center

References

External links
 

Welterweight boxers
Living people
1981 births
People from Giurgiu
Romanian expatriates in Canada
Romanian male boxers